Cocaine Rodeo is the debut studio album by American rock band Mondo Generator, released on Southern Lord Records in 2000. It was compiled of material recorded by vocalist/bassist Nick Oliveri with Rob Oswald of Karma to Burn (drums), vocalist and guitarist Brent Malkus, and his ex-Kyuss bandmates. Recorded in 1997, the material was shelved for three years due to Oliveri's full-time commitment to Queens of the Stone Age. Several of the songs were performed live by Queens of the Stone Age, building up hype before the eventual release of the album.

Three of the album's ten tracks ("13th Floor", "Simple Exploding Man", & "Cocaine Rodeo") feature former members of Kyuss, Josh Homme, Brant Bjork, and Oliveri. This impromptu Kyuss reunion was made possible by Oliveri, who invited each member separately to the studio without any knowledge of who they were playing with. "Simple Exploding Man" features all four original Kyuss members, including vocalist John Garcia, and longtime Kyuss producer Chris Goss.

The American and European album versions feature 2 different bonus tracks.

In 2009, Cocaine Rodeo was re-issued with a bonus disk featuring live material collected from the 2003/2004 tour.

In 2020, Cocaine Rodeo was rereleased as a "20th Anniversary Repress" by Oliveri's current label Heavy Psych Sounds Records.

Track listing

Disc 2

Band members
 Rex Everything – bass (all tracks), lead vocals (tracks 1, 2, 5, 7, 8, 10), producer
 Josh Homme – guitar (tracks 1, 7, 10)
 Brant Bjork – drums (tracks 1, 7, 10)
 Up N. Syder – drums (tracks 2 – 6, 8, 9)
 Burnt Mattress (Brent Malkus) – guitar (tracks 2 – 6, 8, 9), lead vocals (tracks 3, 4, 6, 9, 11)
 John Garcia – background vocals (track 7)
 Chris Goss – background vocals (track 7)

Credits
Recorded and mixed by Steve Feldman at Monkey Studios 1997

Tracks (2,4,5,8,10) Remixed by Schneebie in the Gas Chamber

Mastered by Phil Easter/Malignant Sound Tech/Tucson, AZ

All songs written by Mondo Generator

All songs published by Natural Light Music BMI

Notes
"13th Floor" was later re-recorded as "Tension Head" for Queens of the Stone Age's Rated R album.
"Uncle Tommy" and "Unless I Can Kill" were both originally featured on a split EP with The Jack Saints in 1997.
Acoustic versions of "I Want You to Die" and "Simple Exploding Man" appeared on Oliveri's solo record, Demolition Day.
"Shawnette" was later titled "Shawnette Jackson" on The Best of Mondo Generator and Live at Bronson releases.
The end of "Dead Insects" contains a riff from the song "Carry On Wayward Son" by Kansas.

References

Mondo Generator albums
2000 debut albums
Southern Lord Records albums